The 2002 Washington Huskies football team was an American football team that represented the University of Washington during the 2002 NCAA Division I-A football season.  In its fourth season under head coach Rick Neuheisel, the team compiled a 7–6 record, finished in a four-way tie for fourth place in the Pacific-10 Conference, and outscored its opponents by a combined total of 398 to 342.  Cody Pickett and Ben Mahdavi were selected as the team's most valuable player offensive and defensive players, respectively.

Northwest Championship

Following the UCLA game, the Huskies had a 4–5 record, 1–4 against Pac-10 opponents, and had lost 4 of the last 5 games. The Huskies were at serious risk of a losing season, their first since 1974, and of missing a bowl game.

Through rare happenstance, Washington was scheduled to play the three other Pacific Northwest schools in order to end the season. Neuheisel, sensing an opportunity to motivate his team, declared that despite the thus far disappointing season the Huskies were still fighting to win the "Northwest Championship" by sweeping Oregon State, Oregon, and Washington State in their remaining games.

It was a successful rallying cry, and the Huskies first beat Oregon State. The next week they won at Autzen Stadium, their first win against Oregon at home since 1996. The Huskies capped the season with a triple-overtime victory over No. 3 Washington State in the Apple Cup, claiming the Northwest Championship with back-to-back-to-back wins over the other northwest schools.

Schedule

Roster

Team players in the NFL
No Washington players were selected in the 2003 NFL Draft.

The following finished their college career in 2002, were not drafted, but played in the NFL.

References

Washington
Washington Huskies football seasons
Washington Huskies football